

Year 347 BC was a year of the pre-Julian Roman calendar. At the time it was known in Rome as the Year of the Consulship of Venno and Torquatus (or, less frequently, year 407 Ab urbe condita). The denomination 347 BC for this year has been used since the early medieval period, when the Anno Domini calendar era became the prevalent method in Europe for naming years.

Events 
 By place 
 Greece 
 In the wake of the Macedonian victory at Olynthus, Athens seeks to make peace with Macedonia. Because his financial policy is based on the assumption that Athens should not be involved in major wars, the Athenian leader, Eubulus, works for peace with Philip II of Macedon. Demosthenes is among those who support a compromise.
 An Athenian delegation, comprising Demosthenes, Aeschines and Philocrates, is officially sent to Pella to negotiate a peace treaty with Philip II. During the negotiations, Aeschines seeks to reconcile the Athenians to Macedonia's expansion into Greece. Demosthenes became unhappy with the result.

 Roman Republic 
 Coinage is introduced into Rome for the first time.

 By topic 
 Philosophy 
 Plato dies and his nephew Speusippus is named as head of the Academy.
 Aristotle leaves Athens due to the anti-Macedonian feeling that arises in Athens after Philip II of Macedon has sacked the Greek city-state of Olynthus in 348 BC. With him goes another Academy member of note, Xenocrates of Chalcedon. They establish a new academy on the Asia Minor side of the Aegean Sea at the newly built town of Assus.

Births

Deaths 
 Archytas, Greek philosopher, mathematician and statesman (or 350 BC) (b. 428 BC)
 Plato, Greek philosopher and founder of the Academy in Athens (b. c. 427 BC)
 Eudoxus of Cnidus, Greek philosopher and astronomer who has expanded on Plato's ideas (or 355 BC) (b. 410 BC or 408 BC)

References